The 2016 Just Retirement World Indoor Bowls Championship was held at Potters Leisure Resort, Hopton on Sea, Great Yarmouth, England, from 08-24 January 2016.Nick Brett won the blue riband event (the Men's Singles) for the first time after beating Robert Paxton in a competitive final. In the Open Pairs Stewart Anderson and Darren Burnett recorded their first title success. Burnett doubled up by winning the Mixed Pairs title with Katherine Rednall. Ellen Falkner won the Women's Singles defeating Rebecca Field in the final. This was Falkner's third title and was achieved ten years after her last success.

Wales' Joseph Mower won the inaugural U25 singles event, beating countryman Ross Owen in a tie-break.

Winners

Draw and results

Men's singles

Women's singles

Open Pairs

Mixed Pairs

Open Under 25 Singles

References

External links
Official website

World Indoor Bowls Championship
2016 in bowls
2016 in English sport
International sports competitions hosted by England